José Luis González (born 1937 in Capilla de Guadalupe, Jalisco) is a Mexican composer. He studied in Guadalajara at the Escuela Superior Diocesana de Musica.

References

Living people
1937 births
Date of birth missing (living people)
Musicians from Jalisco
Mexican male composers